Robert Hall is a Special Correspondent for the BBC.
As well as being a Correspondent, since 2009 he is an Occasional Relief Presenter of the BBC News Channel, mainly covering the weekend shifts. He had previously worked at ITN and  Yorkshire Television as a reporter on the evening news programme Calendar. He started his career as a reporter and presenter at Channel Television in Guernsey, Channel Islands in 1977.

Education
Hall was educated at the independent Radley College and the University of Leeds.

Personal life
Hall is married to Mary Green.

References

Year of birth missing (living people)
Living people
Alumni of the University of Leeds
ITN newsreaders and journalists
BBC newsreaders and journalists
British reporters and correspondents
People educated at Radley College